may refer to:

History of the Captivity in Babylon
Parts of Pseudo-Ezekiel